St. Mary's Episcopal Church, also known as St. Mary's, Foggy Bottom or St. Mary's Chapel, is a historic Episcopal church located at 730 23rd Street, N.W. in the Foggy Bottom neighborhood of Washington, D.C. On April 2, 1973, St. Mary's Episcopal Church was added to the National Register of Historic Places.

History

Saint Mary's was founded in 1867 by former members of The Church of the Epiphany, located in Downtown, Washington, D.C.. St. Mary's was the city's first African American Episcopal congregation. The congregation originally met in a Civil War barracks building known as St. Mary's Chapel for Colored People with the first Morning Prayer service held on June 9, 1867.

Architecture
Designed by architects Renwick, Aspinwall & Russell in 1887, the building is an example of Gothic Revival architecture. Decorative features include a timber roof and Tiffany glass windows.

See also

National Register of Historic Places listings in the District of Columbia

References

External links

 St. Mary's Episcopal Church

Churches completed in 1887
19th-century Episcopal church buildings
African-American history of Washington, D.C.
Churches on the National Register of Historic Places in Washington, D.C.
Episcopal churches in Washington, D.C.
Foggy Bottom
Gothic Revival church buildings in Washington, D.C.
Religious organizations established in 1867
1867 establishments in Washington, D.C.
Christianity and race
African-American historic places